Batiste is a surname. Notable people with the surname include:

Alvin Batiste (1932–2007), American jazz clarinetist
D'Anthony Batiste (born 1982), American footballer
Édouard Batiste (1820–1876), French composer and organist
John Batiste (born 1953), United States Army officer
Jon Batiste (born 1986), American jazz pianist
Kevin Batiste (born 1966), American baseball player
Kim Batiste (1968–2020), American baseball player
Lionel Batiste (1931–2012), American jazz musician
Michael Batiste (born 1977), American basketball player
Michael Batiste (born 1970), American footballer
Russell Batiste Jr. (born 1965), American drummer
Spencer Batiste (born 1945), British politician

See also
 Batiste family
 Batiste (disambiguation)
 Batista